Beaumesnil may refer to places in France:
Beaumesnil, Calvados
Beaumesnil, Eure